NGC 3501 is a spiral galaxy 80 million light years away. It is located in the constellation Leo. The galaxy was imaged by the Hubble Space Telescope in 2014, showing an edge-on spiral galaxy; its companion NGC 3507 is not included in the photograph. It is a member of the NGC 3607 Group of galaxies, which is a member of the Leo II Groups, a series of galaxies and galaxy clusters strung out from the right edge of the Virgo Supercluster.

Gallery

References

External links
 

Spiral galaxies
Leo (constellation)
3501
06116
33343